Mykhailo Krechko (ukr. Михайло Михайлович Кречко, September 5, 1925 - November 25, 1996, Lutsk) was a Ukrainian composer, choral conductor, vocalist, People's Artist of the Ukrainian SSR, and leader of the Transcarpathian Choir.

Biography
Mykhailo Krechko was born on September 5, 1925 in the village of Poroshkovo (now Perechyn district of Transcarpathia). Since 1972 she has been a teacher, and since 1990 she has been a professor of Kyiv Conservatory.

From 1954 to 1969 he was the artistic director and chief conductor of the Transcarpathian Folk Choir, from 1969 to 1983 he was the director and artistic director of the Dumka Chapel, and from 1983 he was the chief choirmaster of the Republican Children's Musical Theater in Kyiv. He also taught at the Kyiv Conservatory. Among his students are People's Artist of Ukraine Emil Sokach, Honored Artist O. Tarasenko, Chief Choirmaster of the Children's Musical Theater A. Kucher.

Mykhailo Krechko is an author of "Liturgy of John Chrysostom", original choirs, arrangement of folk songs for the choir, works on musicology, folklore collections. 
His daughter - , is a choirmaster, vocalist, Honored Artist of Ukraine.

Mykhailo Krechko died on November 25, 1996 in Lutsk. He was buried in Kyiv at the Baikove Cemetery.

References

Ukrainian composers
Ukrainian choral conductors
1925 births
1996 deaths
Recipients of the title of People's Artists of Ukraine